Articles (arranged alphabetically) related to Belgium include:

0–9
1st Brigade (Belgium) - 1st Field Artillery Regiment (Belgium) - 1st Squadron (Belgium) - 1st Wing (Belgium) - 1st/3rd Lancers Regiment - 2nd Field Artillery Regiment/Field Artillery Battery ParaCommando - 2nd Tactical Wing - 2nd/4th Lancers Regiment - 4th Engineer Battalion (Belgium) - 4th Group CIS - 4th Logistics Battalion (Belgium) - 5th Group CIS - 6th Group CIS - 7th Brigade (Belgium) - 8th Logistics Battalion (Belgium) - 10th Group CIS - 10th Tactical Wing - 11th Engineer Battalion (Belgium) - 14th Air Defence Artillery Regiment (Belgium) - 18th Logistics Battalion - 20th Logistics Battalion (Belgium) - 24 Hours of Zolder - 27th SS Volunteer Division Langemarck – 28th SS Volunteer Grenadier Division Wallonien – 29th Logistics Battalion (Belgium) - 31st Squadron (Belgium) - 40th Squadron Heli (Belgium) - 51st Logistics Battalion (Belgium) - 62TV Records - 70-point plan (Belgium) – 80th UAV Squadron (Belgium) - 1920 Summer Olympics – 1931 Belgian Grand Prix - 1935 Belgian Grand Prix - 1947 Belgian Grand Prix - 1949 Belgian Grand Prix - 1960-1961 Winter General Strike – 2007 Belgian government formation – 2007–2011 Belgian political crisis – 2008–2009 Belgian financial crisis – 2010–2011 Belgian government formation - 2010 Belgian love triangle skydiving murder trial - 2011 Liège attack

A
Aalst - Aalter - Aangename kennismaking - Aan tafel - Aartselaar - ABC-auto - Abdijen in de lage landen - Abortion in Belgium - Academic libraries in Leuven - Acide sulfurique - Ackermans & van Haaren - ACOS Operations and Training - Action of 19 February 1639 - Admiral of Flanders - Advisory Committee on European Affairs - African rap in Belgium - Albert I of Belgium - Albert II of Belgium - Alfa Papa Tango - Alken - Alle maten - Alles Kan Beter - Alveringem - Anderlecht - Anglo-Belgian Society - Animo (organization) - Anneessens, Frans - Another Left - Anspach, Eugène - Antéchrista - Antoine - Antwerpen-Centraal railway station - Antwerp - Antwerp Diamond Giants - Antwerp Province - Anzegem - Aquatopia (Antwerp) - Arab European League - Ardennes - Ardennes Chasseur Regiment - Ardooie - Arelerland - Arendonk - Argenta - Arrondissement Court (Belgium) - As - Assenede - Associated Weavers - Association Electronique Libre - Association with lucrative purpose - Association without lucrative purpose - Asterix Kieldrecht - Astro Tower - Atomium - Attentat (Nothomb) - Au Gringo's bar - Austrian Netherlands kronenthaler - Automotive Cluster of Wallonia - Avelgem - Avenue de Tervueren

B
Baarle-Hertog - Badius, Jodocus - Balen - Banking in Belgium - Banking, Finance and Insurance Commission (Belgium) - Barrier Treaty - Basilica of the Sacred Heart - Basketball League Belgium - Bastogne - Batetela Rebellions - Battle of Benevento - Battle of Beverhoutsveld - Battle of Bouvines - Battle of Cadsand - Battle of Cassel (1071) - Battle of Cassel (1328) - Battle of Charleroi - Battle of Flanders - Battle of Flushing - Battle of Hasselt - Battle of Leuven (891) - Battle of Leuven (1831) - Battle of lillo - Battle of Mons-en-Pévèle - Battle of Nieuwpoort - Battle of Oudenarde - Battle of Passchendaele - Battle of Roosebeke - Battle of Saint-Omer - Battle of Sluis (1603) - Battle of Sprimont - Battle of the Downs - Battle of the Golden Spurs - Battle of Turnhout (1789) - Battle of Warns - Battle of Waterloo - Baudouin I of Belgium - Beaulieu International Group - Beaumont - Beer in Belgium - Beernem - Beerse - Bekaert - Bekaert, Léon - BEL20 - Belgacom Fund - Belgacom TV - Belgae - Belga (news agency) - Belgian American - Belgian Anti-Racism Law - Belgian Badminton Federation - Belgian Brazilian - Belgian Chamber Committee on Justice - Belgian Chamber Committee on the Interior - Belgian Civil Aviation Authority - Belgian colonial empire - Belgian Congo - Belgian Co-ordinated Collections of Micro-organisms - Belgian Eifel - Belgian euro coins - Belgian Federal Science Policy Office - Belgian franc - Belgian French - Belgian federal election, 2003 - Belgian federal election, 2007 - Belgian federal election, 2010 - Belgian General Information and Security Service - Belgian general strike of 1893 - Belgian general strikes - Belgian Holocaust denial law - Belgian Institute for Normalization - Belgian Labour Party - Belgian Lorraine - Belgian Linguistics Case - Belgian Medical Component - Belgian minehunter Bellis (M916) - Belgian local elections, 2006 - Belgian National Cyclo-cross Championships - Belgian national identification card - Belgian nationalism - Belgian nationality law - Belgian National Geographic Institute - Belgian National Internet eXchange - Belgian Official Journal - Belgian passport - Belgian Post Group - Belgian local elections, 2000 - Belgian Red Cattle - Belgian Resistance - Belgian regional elections, 2004 - Belgian revolution - Belgian Royal Escort - Belgian Rugby Federation - Belgians - Belgian Senate Committee on Foreign Relations and Defence - Belgian State Security Service - Belgian stay-behind network - Belgian waffle - Belgian Women's First Division - Belgium - Belgium at the 2004 Summer Olympics - Belgium at the European Athletics Championships - Belgium–Canada relations - Belgium in the Eurovision Song Contest 1986 - Belgium in the Eurovision Song Contest 2003 - Belgium–Malaysia relations - Belgium–Kosovo relations - Belgium–Luxembourg Economic Union - Belgium–Mexico relations - Belgium–Netherlands relations - Belgium–Russia relations - Belgium–Ukraine relations - Belgium – United Kingdom relations - Belgium – United States relations - Belgium women's volleyball Division of Honour - BELNET - Beringen - Berlaar - Berlare - Berx, Cathy - Beurre d'Ardenne - Beveren - BIPIB - Bilzen - Biographie Nationale de Belgique - BioLiège - BioVallée - Biographie de la faim - Blankenberge - Bloso - Bocholt, Belgium - Boël, Yves - Boechout - Boelare Castle - Boerentoren - Bois de la Cambre - Bombardment of Brussels - Bonheiden - Boom, Antwerp - B Plus - Borgloon - Borinage - Bornem - Borsbeek - Bossemans et Coppenolle - Le Boulevard périphérique - Le Bourgmestre de Furnes - Brabançonne - Braine-le-Comte - Brakel - Brasschaat - Brasserie Caracole - Brecht - Bredene - Bree - Bree BBC - Brel, Jacques - Brepols - Brepols, Philippus Jacobus - Brueghel, Pieter the Elder - Bruges - Brussels - Brussels Airport - Brussels and the European Union - Brussels-Capital Region - Brussels Coin Cabinet - Brussels Conference Act of 1890 - Brussels Enterprises Commerce and Industry - Brussels-Halle-Vilvoorde - Brussels Intercommunal Transport Company - Brussels International (1897) - Brussels International 1910 - Brussels International Exposition (1935) - Brussels Metro - Brussels Parliament - Brussels Parliament building - Brussels South Charleroi Airport - Buckriders - Buggenhout - Bureau Veritas - Paul Buysse

C
Callebaut - Callewaert, Jan - Campus Blairon - Cancer Registry Foundation - Cantons of Belgium - La Capitale - Capital punishment in Belgium - Carbonade flamande - Carine ou la jeune fille folle de son âme - Casterman - Château of Val-Duchesse - Catholic Party (Belgium) - Catholic University of Leuven (1834–1968) - Catholic University of Mechlin - Les Catilinaires - Cavell, Edith - Centre for Equal Opportunities and Opposition to Racism - Centre Démocrate Humaniste - Cercle de Lorraine - Cercle Gaulois - Cercle Royal du Parc - César De Paepe - Chamber of rhetoric - Chant des Wallons - Charter of Kortenberg - Charter of Quaregnon - Château de Lavaux-Sainte-Anne - Château d'Enghien (Belgium) - Chenogne massacre - Chief of Defence (Belgium) - Chiro - Christen-Democratisch en Vlaams (CD&V) - Christene Volkspartij - Christian Social Party (Belgium, defunct) - Christlich-Soziale Partei (CSP) - CIA activities in Belgium - Cinema of Belgium - Citrique Belge - Circulaire - City of Brussels - City rights in the Low Countries - City status in Belgium - Claeys Formula - Classic 21 - Clijsters, Kim - Cockerill, John - Cockerill, William - Le Cocu magnifique - De Collega's - Collège Saint-Pierre Uccle - Colruyt - Colruyt, Jef - Les Combustibles - Comics - Commercial Court (Belgium) - Commission communautaire française - Communications in Belgium - Committee for Another Policy - Committee P - Common Community Commission - Communist Party (Flanders) - Communist Party (Wallonia) - Communist Struggle (Marxist–Leninist) - Communities, regions and language areas of Belgium - Compromise of Nobles - Confederation of Christian Trade Unions - Confiserie Roodthooft - Congo Crisis - Congo Free State - Constitutional Court of Belgium - Copycat (Patrick Ouchène song) - Corbeels, Pieter - Corsio - Cosmétique de l'ennemi - Jan Coucke and Pieter Goethals - Coudenberg group - Cougnou - Council of State (Belgium) - Countess of Flanders - Count of Flanders - County of Flanders - County of Loon - Le Coup de lune - Le Couronnement de Renart - Court of appeal (Belgium) - Court of Arbitration of Belgium - Court of assizes (Belgium) - Court of Audit of Belgium - Court of Cassation (Belgium) - Court of labour (Belgium) - Covering of the Senne - Crabbé, Ben - Crisis and Emergency Management Centre - Croix de la Grise - CropDesign - Cross of the Deported 1914-1918 - Crown Council of Belgium - Culture of Belgium - Cumerio

D
Damme - Dardenne, Sabine - David, Jean-Baptist - Day of the Flemish Community - de Clecq, Staff - Decree (Belgium) - Declaration of Revision of the Constitution - Deerlijk - De Gordel - Degrelle, Léon - De Haan - Dehaene, Jean-Luc - de Haussy, François-Philippe - Deinze - Delahaye, Gilbert - de Merode, Alexandre - Demographics of Belgium - Dender - Denderleeuw - Dendermonde - Dentergem - De Panne - De Pinte - Dessel - Destelbergen - Deux-Nèthes - De Warande (Club) - De Wever, Bart - Dexia - Diepenbeek - Diksmuide - Dilsen-Stokkem - Dioxine affair - Django Reinhardt Jazz Festival - Di Rupo, Elio - Di Rupo I Government - Draining law - Duchy of Brabant - Duchy of Limburg - Duchy of Limburg (1839–1867) - Dutch and Flemish Renaissance painting - Duffel - Dupuis, Jacques - Dutroux, Marc - Dyle (department) - Jacqueline Dyris

E
East Flanders - East Flemish - Ecolo - Economy of Belgium - Edegem - Education in Belgium - Eeklo - Egmont pact - Ekeren - Elmore D - Elsene / Ixelles - Erpe-Mere - Escaut (department) - Essen - Etterbeek - Eupen - Eupen-Malmedy - European Movement Belgium - Eurostar - Evere - Evergem - Eyskens, Gaston

F
Father Damien - First Schools' War - Flag of Belgium - Flamingant - Flanders - Flanders Investment and Trade - Flemish - Flemish Baroque painting - Flemish Brabant - Flemish Council for Science and Innovation - Flemish Community Commission - Flemish movement - Flemish National Union - Flemish Region - Flemish Secession hoax - Flemish Sign Language - Florennes Air Base - Folklore of the Low Countries - Foreign relations of Belgium - Forêts - Fortifications of Brussels - Fortis (finance) - Fourniret, Michel - Franck, César - Franco-Belgian comics - France–Habsburg rivalry - Francization of Brussels - Franco-Dutch War - Francqui, Emile - Free Belgian Forces - French Community Commission - French Community of Belgium - French fried potatoes - French Flanders - Frère, Albert - Front Démocratique des Francophones (FDF) - Frontpartij

G
Gachot, Bertrand - Gallia Belgica - Ganshoren - Gaume - Gavere - Geel - General Federation of Belgian Labour - General strike against Leopold III of Belgium - Genk - Geography of Belgium - Geraardsbergen - Gesell, Silvio - Gevaert, Lieven - Ghent - Gingelom - Gistel - Goffin, Albert - Gordel (De) - Governor of Brussels-Capital - Gravensteengroep - Groen! - Great Council of Mechelen - Greater Netherlands - Great Privilege - Group Joos - Grétry, André Ernest Modeste - Grobbendonk - Grote Markt / Grand-Place

H
Haaltert - Hainaut Province - Halen - Halle - Ham - Hamme - Hamont-Achel - Harelbeke - Habsburg Netherlands - Hasselt - Healthcare in Belgium - Hechtel-Eksel - Heers - Heist-op-den-Berg - Hemiksem - Henin, Justine - Hepburn, Audrey - Herentals - Herenthout - Hergé - Herk-de-Stad - Heerlijkheid - Herselt - Herstappe - Herzele - Heusden-Zolder - Heuvelland - Heysel - Heysel Stadium - Heysel Stadium disaster - High Council of Justice (Belgium) - History of Belgium - History of Belgium before 1830 - History of Flanders - History of the Walloon movement - History of urban centers in the Dutch Low Countries - History of Wallonia - Hoeselt - Hooglede - Hoogstraten - Hoornaert, Paul - Hooverphonic - Horebeke - Hoste, Geert - Houthalen-Helchteren - Houthulst - Hove, Belgium - Hulshout - Human Rights League (Belgium) - Human Rights League (Dutch-speaking Belgium) - Human Rights League (French-speaking Belgium) - Huppen, Hermann

I
Ichtegem - Ickx, Jacky - Ingelmunster - Innotek (Belgium) - International association without lucrative purpose - International rankings of Belgium - Iron Rhine - Ixelles - Izegem - IJzerwake

J
Jabbeke - Jamar, Alexandre - Jansen, Georges - Janson, Paul-Emile - Jemmape (department) - Jenever - Jette - La Jeune Belgique - Jeune Europe

K
Kalmthout - Kapellen - Kaprijke - Kasterlee - Katholieke Universiteit Leuven - KBC Bank - Keytrade Bank - Kinrooi - Kinsbergen, Andries - Kluisbergen - Knesselare - Knokke-Heist - Koekelare - Koekelberg - Koksijde - Kontich - Kortemark - Kortessem - Kortrijk - Kriek - Kruibeke - Kruishoutem - Kuurne

L
Laakdal - Laarne - Labour Court (Belgium) - Lamoral, Count of Egmont - Lanaken - Land of Herve - Langemark-Poelkapelle - Language legislation in Belgium - Larock, Victor - Law Courts of Brussels - Law of Belgium - Lebbeke - Lede - Ledegem - Leffe - Legislative Order (Belgium) - Leie - Lendelede - Leo Belgicus - Leopold I of Belgium - Leopold II of Belgium - Leopold III of Belgium - Leopoldsburg - Lernout & Hauspie - Le Soir - Leterme, Yves - Leterme I Government - Leterme II Government - Les XX - Leysen, André - Leysen, Christian - Leysen, Thomas - LGBT rights in Belgium - Liberales - Liberalism in Belgium - Lichtervelde - Liège Airport - Liège–Bastogne–Liège - Liège Cathedral - Liège - Liège Province - Liège Wars -  Lier - Lierde - Lighthouses and lightvessels in Belgium - Lille, Belgium - Limburg (Belgium) - Limburger cheese - Limburgish language - Lint - List of airports in Belgium - List of ambassadors from Belgium - List of ambassadors to Belgium - List of ambassadors from New Zealand to Belgium - List of banks in Belgium - List of birds of Belgium - List of Belgian bands and artists - List of Belgian films - List of Belgian films: Pre 1960 - List of Belgian films: 1960s - List of Belgian films: 1970s - List of Belgian films: 1980s - List of Belgian films: 1990s - List of Belgian films: 2000s - List of Belgian films: 2010s - List of Belgian flags - List of Belgian monarchs - List of Belgian municipalities by population - List of Belgian newspapers - List of Belgian political scandals - List of Belgian records in swimming - List of Belgium-related articles - List of Belgians - List of Belgian submissions for the Academy Award for Best Foreign Language Film - List of cities in Belgium - List of companies of Belgium - List of diplomatic missions in Belgium - List of diplomatic missions of Belgium - List of football clubs in Belgium - List of Franco-Belgian comic series - List of governments in Belgium - List of hospitals in Belgium - List of lakes in Belgium - List of mammals of Belgium - List of mayors of the City of Brussels - List of members of the National Congress of Belgium - List of Ministers-President of the Brussels-Capital Region - List of Ministers-President of the Flemish Community - List of Ministers-President of the Walloon Region - List of motorways in Belgium - List of municipalities of the Flemish Region - List of municipalities in Wallonia - List of national parks of Belgium - List of newspapers in Belgium - List of people on stamps of Belgium - List of political parties in Flanders - List of postal codes in Belgium - List of presidents of the Parliament of the French Community of Belgium - List of prime ministers of Belgium - List of railway lines in Belgium - List of rivers of Belgium - List of shopping malls in Belgium - List of SNCB/NMBS classes - List of speakers of the Parliament of the German-speaking Community - List of television stations in Belgium - List of town tramway systems in Belgium - List of twin towns and sister cities in Belgium - List of universities in Belgium - Lochristi - Lokeren - Lommel - Lorrain language - Lo-Reninge - Lotharingia - Lovendegem - Low Countries - Low Dietsch dialects - Lower Lorraine - Lummen - Luxembourg (Belgium) - Luxembourgish language - Lys (department)

M
Maarkedal - Maaseik - Maasmechelen - Maddens Doctrine - Maeterlinck, Maurice - Magritte, René - Maingain, Olivier - Maldegem - Malle - Malmedy massacre - Malmedy massacre trial - Man Bites Dog - Manifesto for Walloon culture - Manneken Pis - Marollen - Marols - Martens, Wilfried - Matsys, Quentin -  Mariage, Benoît - Marlier, Marcel - Mechelen - Meerhout - Meetjesland - Meeuwen-Gruitrode - Melle - Menen - Mercator, Gerardus - Merckx, Eddy - Merelbeke - Merksplas - Mertens, Pierre - Mesen - Meulebeke - Meuse-Inférieure - Meuse-Rhenish - Middelkerke - Military of Belgium - Minimum legal ages in Belgium - Ministerial Order - Minister-President of the Brussels Capital-Region - Moerbeke - Mol - Monarchy of Belgium - Moules-frites - Moorslede - Mortsel - Mosan art - Mosan style - Motoring regulations in Belgium - Mouvement Réformateur - Municipalities in Belgium - Municipalities of the Brussels-Capital Region - Municipalities with language facilities - Mythology of the Low Countries - Murder of Joe Van Holsbeeck

N
Namur - Namur Province - National Bank of Belgium - Nazareth, Belgium - Neerpelt - Nevele - Niel - Nieuw-Vlaamse Alliantie (N-VA) - Nieuwerkerken - Nieuwpoort, Belgium - Nijlen - Nine Years' War - Ninove- North Sea Fisheries Convention

O
Official Journal (Belgium) - Old University of Leuven - Olen - Oliveira, Luis - Oosterzele - Oostkamp - Oostrozebeke - Opglabbeek - Orangism (Belgium) - Order of Flemish Militants - Order of Queen Elisabeth of Belgium - Ordinance (Belgium) - Ortelius, Abraham - Ostend - Ostend Company - Oudenaarde - Oudenburg - Oudergem / Auderghem - Oud-Turnhout - Ourthe (department) - Outline of Belgium - Overpelt

P
Pajottenland - Paris embassy terrorist attack plot - Parliamentary inquiries by the Belgian Federal Parliament - Parliament of the Brussels-Capital Region - Partei der deutschsprachigen Belgier (PDB) - Partei für Freiheit und Fortschritt (PFF) - Parti du Travail de Belgique (PTB) - Partij van de Arbeid van België (PvdA) - Parti Socialiste - Partition of Belgium - Partitions of Luxembourg - Paulus, Camille - Peasants' War (1798) - Peer - Peeters directive - Pfaff Jean-Marie - Picard language - Picqué, Charles - Pirson, André-Eugène - Pittem - Poirot, Hercule - Polder Model - Political parties in Belgium - Politics and Government of the Brussels-Capital Region - Politics of Belgium - Politics of Flanders - Poperinge - Prévinaire, Eugène - Princes Park, Retie - Principality of Stavelot-Malmedy - Progressive Party (Belgium) - Provoost, Anne - Proost (company) - Province of Brabant - Provinces of Belgium - Public Centre for Social Welfare - Purple (government) - Putte - Puurs

R
Rail transport in Belgium - Ranst - Rape of Belgium - Rassemblement Wallonie France - Rattachism - Ravels - Regulation (Brussels) - Reinhardt, Django - Renaissance in the Low Countries - Renardism - Republic of Bouillon - Retie - Rexism - Riemst - Rijkevorsel - Rivers of Belgium - Roeselare - Rogge, Jacques - Rogier, Charles - Roman Catholic Archdiocese of Cambrai - Roman Catholic Archdiocese of Mechelen-Brussels - Roman Catholic Diocese of Liège - Roman/Red - Ronse - Rotselaar - Royal Library of Belgium - Royal Military Academy (Belgium) - Royal Museums of Fine Arts of Belgium - Royal Order - Royal Question - RTBF - Ruanda-Urundi - Ruiselede - Rumst - Rupelmonde

S
SABAM - St. Lambert's Cathedral, Liège - Sambre-et-Meuse - Same-sex marriage in Belgium - Sarre (department) - Sax, Adolphe - Schaarbeek / Schaerbeek - Scheldt - Schelle - Schilde - Schoten - Schuiten, François - Scifo, Enzo - Science and technology in Brussels - Science and technology in Flanders - Science and technology in Wallonia - Second Schools' War - Second walls of Brussels - Senne - Seventeen Provinces - Siege of Hulst (1591), Siege of Hulst (1596), Siege of Hulst (1645) - Siege of Leuven - Siege of Namur (1695) - Siege of Ostend - Signal de Botrange - Sillon industriel - Singing Nun, The - Sint-Agatha-Berchem / Berchem-Sainte-Agathe - Sint-Amands - Sint-Gillis / Saint-Gilles - Sint-Gillis-Waas - Sint-Jans-Molenbeek / Molenbeek-Saint-Jean - Sint-Joost-ten-Node / Saint-Josse-ten-Noode - Sint-Katelijne-Waver - Sint-Lambrechts-Woluwe / Woluwe-Saint-Lambert - Sint-Laureins - Sint-Lievens-Houtem - Sint-Martens-Latem - Sint-Niklaas - Sint-Pieters-Woluwe / Woluwe-Saint-Pierre - Sint-Truiden - Sioen Industries - Sixth Belgian state reform - Small ring (Brussels) - Socialistische Partij - Anders (sp.a) - Sonian Forest - Southeast Limburgish dialect - South Tower (Brussels) - Spaak, Paul-Henri - Speaker of the Flemish Parliament - Special law - Spiere-Helkijn - Spirit - Stabroek - Staden - State Archives in Belgium - State reform in Belgium - State University of Leuven - Stekene - Stella Artois - Stevin, Simon - Stouthuysen, Bob - Supreme Headquarters Allied Powers Europe

T
Talleyrand partition plan for Belgium - Tambuyzer, Erik - Temse - Tessenderlo - Thalys - Theunis, Georges - Tielt - Tienen - Timeline of Burgundian and Habsburg acquisitions in the Low Countries - Tintin, the Adventures of - Tongeren - Torhout - Tourism in Belgium - Transportation in Belgium - Treaty of London (1839) - Tremeloo - Turnhout

U
Ukkel / Uccle - Unionism in Belgium - Union Wallonne des Entreprises - United States of Belgium - Université catholique de Louvain - University of Douai - University of Ghent -University of Liège - UNIZO - Urbanus

V
Valois Tapestries - Van Damme, Jean-Claude - Van den Bergh, Frans - Vandenbroucke, Frank (cyclist) - Van der Rest, Leon - van Rysselberghe, Théo - van Eyck, Jan - Van Genechten Packaging - Van Hoegaerden, Victor - Van Rompuy, Herman - Van Rompuy I Government - Van Zeeland, Paul - Verdinaso - Emile Verhaeren - Verhofstadt, Dirk - Verhofstadt, Guy - Verhofstadt III Government - Verlooy, Jan-Baptist - Vesalius, Andreas - Veurne - Vieille Montagne - Vink, Karel - Visa requirements for Belgian citizens - Vlaams Belang - Vlaams Blok - Vlaamse Gemeenschapscommissie - Vlaamse Volksbeweging - Vlaamse Liberalen en Democraten (VLD) - Vlerick, André - Vleteren - VLOTT - Voeren - Volens (NGO) - Vorselaar - Vorst (Forest) - Vosselaar

W
Waarschoot - Waasland - Waasmunster - Wachtebeke - Walibi Belgium - Wallonia - Wallonie Libre - Walloon Brabant - Walloon Export and Foreign Investment Agency - Walloon Jacquerie of 1886 - Walloon language - Walloon Parliament - Walloons - Walloon SME finance and guarantee company - War Crimes Law (Belgium) - War of the Austrian Succession - War of Devolution - War of the Reunions - War of the Spanish Succession - War of the Succession of Flanders and Hainault - Waregem - Warocqué, Raoul - Water supply and sanitation in Belgium - Watermaal-Bosvoorde / Watermael-Boitsfort - Wellen - Wervik - Westerlo - West Flanders - West Flemish - Western Hainaut - Wetteren - Wevelgem - Walthéry, François - Westhoek (region) - Wichelen - Wielsbeke - Wijnegem - Willebroek - Willems, Jan Frans - Wingene - Witte, Els - Woluwe-Saint-Etienne - Woluwe-Saint-Lambert - Woluwe-Saint-Pierre - Wommelgem - Wortegem-Petegem - Wuustwezel

Y
Young Green! - Ypres

Z
Zandhoven - Zedelgem - Zele - Zelzate - Zemst - Zingem - Zoersel - Zomergem - Zonhoven - Zonnebeke - Zottegem - Zuienkerke - Zulte - Zutendaal - Zwalm - Zwevegem - Zwijndrecht, Belgium - Zwin

Belgium